Charaxes (Polyura) alphius, or Staudinger's nawab, is a butterfly in the family Nymphalidae. It was described by Otto Staudinger in 1886. It is found on Timor and Sulawesi near the Wallace Line.

Subspecies
Charaxes alphius alphius (Timor)
Charaxes alphius piepersianus (Martin, 1924) (southern Sulawesi)

References

External links
Polyura Billberg, 1820 at Markku Savela's Lepidoptera and Some Other Life Forms

Polyura
Butterflies described in 1886